The Red Song Society is a Chinese website promoting Maoism in mainland China, sponsored by Shenzhen Red Song Society Culture Consulting Co., Ltd. The website's motto is "sing red songs; promote righteous ways".

History 
Created in May 2011, the website is formerly known as the Shenzhen Red Song Society Forum. After the Bo Xilai incident in 2012, the website was shut down along with the Utopia and Maoflag, later restarted.

In 2017, member of the website and Hong Zhenquai, a Chinese writer of the Yanhuang Chunqiu, went to court in the People's Court of Bao'an District, Shenzhen City over the authenticity of Five Heroes of Mountain Langya. Hong lost in the first trial and subsequently filed an appeal. In 2018, the Shenzhen Intermediate People's Court in Guangdong Province issued a review verdict that the Red Song Society website did not constitute an infringement of Hong Zhenquai's reputation rights. However, according to Guo and Garrick, the case is still under review.

In July 2022, Hubei Daily Media Group announced that it sued the Red Song Society for reprinting the article without permission.

Analysis 
The Red Song Society has been described as a Maoist left-wing or far-left website. Jude Blanchet, who majored in China's neo-Maoism, describes the website as the neo-Maoist version of Drudge Report. An article from the Economist says posts on the Red Song Society argue that life was fairer in the Mao era because the state then provided free housing, free education and free medical care for urban workers at the time.

References

External links 
  (in Chinese)

Chinese New Left
Chinese websites
2011 establishments in China
Internet properties established in 2011